Professional amateur may refer to:

Pro–am (professional–amateur), a level of play between amateur and professional in sports
Amateur professionalism, a socio-economic concept of amateur output of professional quality

See also

 Professional (disambiguation)
 Amateur (disambiguation)